An illusion is a distortion of the senses.

Illusion or Illusions may also refer to:

Arts, entertainment and media

Film 
 Illusion (1929 film), an American film starring Buddy Rogers
 Illusion (1967 film), a Croatian film
 Illusion (2004 film), a film starring Kirk Douglas
 Illusions (1930 film), a French silent comedy film
 Illusions (1982 film), a film by Julie Dash

Gaming 
 Illusions (video game), a 1984 ColecoVision game
 Illusion (series), a video game series by Sega
 Pinball Illusions, a 1995 computer game

Literature 
 The Illusion (novel), a 1999 Animorphs novel by K. A. Applegate
 Illusions (Bach novel), a 1977 novel by Richard Bach
 Illusions (Pike novel), a 2011 novel by Aprilynne Pike
 Illusions, a 1987 novel by Charlotte Vale Allen
 Illusions, a 1997 novel by Janet Dailey
 Illusions, a 2000 novel by Jean Saunders

Music

Bands
 Illusion (band), British progressive rock band formed in 1977
 The Illusion (band), American psychedelic hard rock band formed in 1969

Albums
 Illusion (Faith Hill album), unreleased
 Illusion (Gaby Moreno album), 2016
 Illusion (Renaissance album), 1971
 Illusion (Shahin Najafi album), 2009
 Illusion (Spoken album), 2013
 Illusion (Poor Moon EP), 2012
 Illusion (ZE:A EP), 2013
 Illusions (Arthur Blythe album), 1980, and the title track
 Illusions (Crematory album), 1995
 Illusions (Eliane Elias album), 1986
 Illusions (Michale Graves album), 2007
 Illusions (Sadus album), 1988
 Illusions (Thomas Bergersen album), 2011
 Illusions (Ute Lemper album), 1992
 The Illusion (album), by The Illusion, 1969

Songs
 "Illusion" (Krassimir Avramov song), 2009
 "Illusion", a song by Ateez from the 2019 EP Treasure EP.3: One to All
 "Illusion", a song by Benassi Bros from the 2004 album Pumphonia
 "Illusion", a song by Destiny's Child from the 1998 album Destiny's Child
 "Illusion", a 2018 song by GreatGuys
 "Illusion", a song by Kylie Minogue from the 2010 album Aphrodite
 "Illusion", a 1968 song by The Motions
 "Illusion", a song by One Direction from the 2014 album Four
 "Illusion", a song by Ross Lynch from the 2012 soundtrack album Austin & Ally
 "Illusion", a song by VNV Nation from the 2007 album Judgement
 "Illusion", a song by Zedd from the 2015 album by True Colors
 "Illusions" (Cypress Hill song), 1996
 "Illusions", a 1966 song by The Human Instinct
 "Illusions", a song by Kid Cudi from the 2016 album Passion, Pain & Demon Slayin'
 "Illusions", a 1976 song by Lone Star
 "Illusions", a song by Sundara Karma from the 2019 album Ulfilas' Alphabet
 "Illusions", a song by Theatre of Tragedy from the 2009 album Forever Is the World

Other uses in arts and entertainment 
 The Illusion (play), a 2003 play by Tony Kushner
 Illusion (musical), a 1986 Australian stage musical 
 "Illusion", an episode of the Mission: Impossible 1966 TV series
 Illusion (comics), a fictional character in Marvel comics

Other uses
 Aesthetic illusion, a type of mental absorption
 Illusion (company), a Japanese 3D graphics company
 Illusion (keelboat), a type of boat
 Illusion (turn), a rotation of the body in dance and gymnastics
 Illusion, a subgenre of magic, a performing art
 Maya (religion) (literally 'illusion' or 'magic'), with multiple meanings in Indian philosophies
 Vekoma Illusion, a type of roller coaster

See also

 Grand Illusion (disambiguation)
 Ilusión (disambiguation)
 Illusionism (disambiguation)